Bora–Witóto (also Bora–Huitoto, Bora–Uitoto, or, ambiguously, Witotoan) is a proposal to unite the Boran and Witotoan language families of southwestern Colombia (Amazonas Department) and neighboring regions of Peru and Brazil. Kaufman (1994) added the Andoque language.

Family division

Boran
Witotoan (or Witoto–Ocaina)

Kaufman (1994) lists Bóran and Witótoan (Huitoto–Ocaina) as separate families (they are grouped together with Andoque as Bora–Witótoan; by 2007 he moved Andoque to Witotoan).

Genetic relations
Aschmann (1993) proposed Bora–Witoto as a connection between the Boran and Witotoan language families. Echeverri & Seifart (2016) refute the connection.

Kaufman (2007) includes Bora-Witoto in his Macro-Andean proposal, and added the Andoque language to the Witotoan family. (Aschmann had considered Andoque a language isolate.) These proposals have not been accepted by other linguists. Gildea and Payne (2007) checked Bora-Witoto with Andoque, Proto-Cariban and Yagua, and found Bora-Witoto to be not related to any of the others.

Mason (1950: 236–238) groups Bora–Witoto, Tupian, and Zaparoan together as part of a proposed Macro-Tupí-Guaranían family.

References

Bibliography
 Aschmann, Richard P. (1993). Proto Witotoan. Publications in linguistics (No. 114). Arlington, TX: SIL & the University of Texas at Arlington.
 Campbell, Lyle. (1997). American Indian languages: The historical linguistics of Native America. New York: Oxford University Press. .
 Echeverri, Juan Alvaro & Frank Seifart. (2016). Proto-Witotoan: A re-evaluation of the distant genealogical relationship between the Boran and Witotoan linguistic families.
 Gildea, Spike and Doris Payne. (2007). Is Greenberg's "Macro-Carib" viable? Bol. Mus. Para. Emílio Goeldi. Ciencias Humanas, Belém, v. 2, n. 2, p. 19-72, May-Aug. 2007 Online version: http://www.museu-goeldi.br/editora/bh/artigos/chv2n2_2007/Greenbergs(gildea).pdf
 Greenberg, Joseph H. (1987). Language in the Americas. Stanford: Stanford University Press.
 Kaufman, Terrence. (1990). Language history in South America: What we know and how to know more. In D. L. Payne (Ed.), Amazonian linguistics: Studies in lowland South American languages (pp. 13–67). Austin: University of Texas Press. .
 Kaufman, Terrence. (1994). The native languages of South America. In C. Mosley & R. E. Asher (Eds.), Atlas of the world's languages (pp. 46–76). London: Routledge.

External links
 Proel:
 Familia Bora–Witoto

 
Indigenous languages of the South American Northern Foothills
Indigenous languages of Western Amazonia
Proposed language families